Polypoetes corneola is a moth of the family Notodontidae. It is found in south-eastern Peru.

The length of the forewings is 15 mm for males and 15.5 mm for females. The ground color of the forewings is blackish gray to dark coppery gray, more sparsely scaled in the basal third. The ground color of the hindwings is black to blackish gray, but the basal half is lighter and more sparsely scaled.

Etymology
The name is derived from the Latin corneolus (meaning horny) and refers to the genitalia of this species. Males possess paired horns, while females bear hornlike structures.

References

Moths described in 2008
Notodontidae of South America